Patrick Prosser (born 8 September 1952) is a Computer Scientist who spent the bulk of his career at the University of Glasgow. His research has centred on Constraint programming, although it has extended into the application of those techniques into other areas.  For his major contributions to the theory and practice of Constraint Programming, Patrick was awarded the Association for Constraint Programming's Research Excellence Award on 15 September 2011: he is only the sixth recipient of this award. He gave a prerecorded acceptance speech, which is available on YouTube.

His most notable contribution is his invention of Conflict-directed backjumping, an advanced technique for reducing search in constraint problems by avoiding unnecessary work on backtracking. His 1993 paper describing this has been widely cited.

Other areas of constraint programming he has researched include the identification of hard problems
and techniques for solving vehicle routing problems. His interest in applications of constraint programming has included (for example) how it can be used in computing species trees.

Amongst his recreations is kite flying as a founder of the Kite Club of Scotland.    He has written about the Tetrahedral kite.

References

External links
 Patrick Prosser's home page at the University of Glasgow.
 Google Scholar search for Patrick Prosser's papers.

British computer scientists
Academics of the University of Glasgow
Alumni of the University of Strathclyde
1952 births
Living people
Scottish computer scientists